"Bohemian Rhapsody" is a song by the British rock band Queen.

Bohemian Rhapsody may also refer to:
 Bohemian Rhapsody (2018), biopic about Freddie Mercury and Queen
 Bohemian Rhapsody: The Original Soundtrack, 2018
 "Bohemian Rhapsody" (That '70s Show), a TV episode
 "Bohemian Rhapsody" (The Muppets), a video and cover version of the Queen song
 "Bohemian Rhapsody (1–5)", episodes of the Stone Ocean story arc of the Japanese manga series JoJo's Bizarre Adventure 
 "Bohemian Rhapsody", 14th episode of the Cowboy Bebop anime series

See also

List of Bohemian Rhapsody cover versions
The Story of Bohemian Rhapsody, a 2004 documentary about the song by Queen and Freddie Mercury